Richard Gasquet was the defending champion, but lost to Milos Raonic in the semifinals.
Raonic went on to win the title, defeating Tomáš Berdych in the final, 7–6(7–4), 6–3.

Seeds

Draw

Finals

Top half

Bottom half

Qualifying

Seeds

Qualifiers

Qualifying draw

First qualifier

Second qualifier

Third qualifier

Fourth qualifier

External links
 Main draw
 Qualifying draw

Singles
PTT Thailand Open - Singles
 in Thai tennis